Pakala is a village in Prakasam district of the Indian state of Andhra Pradesh. It is located in Singarayakonda mandal.

Geography

Demographics
 India census, Pakala had a population of 26,500 Males: 14,000. Females: 12,500.

See also 
Singarayakonda mandal

References

Villages in Prakasam district